Sar'akhor is a volcano in Iran.

The tectonic regimen in Iran is characterized by the past collision of Arabia with Asia and the still ongoing convergence, which is accommodated by strike-slip faulting and contraction in the Alborz Mountains and the Zagros Mountains. Sar'akhor lies in the Kopeh Dag region where Central Iran and Eurasia interact.

It is formed by a foundation made of basaltic lava which occasionally contains olivine and an edifice proper constructed by andesite and dacite in the form of pyroclastics. It was active between the Miocene and Pliocene.

Sar'akhor belongs to a group of intraplate volcanoes such as Mount Etna in Italy and Ararat and Damavand in the Near East which appear to be more dependent on deep processes rather than crustal boundaries.

It is crossed by the Sar'akhor fault, which has partly offset the edifice and has had historical earthquakes.

References

Sources 
 

Miocene volcanoes
Pliocene volcanoes
Volcanoes of Iran